Stanley Herbert Johnson Jr. (born May 29, 1996) is an American professional basketball player for the Sioux Falls Skyforce of the NBA G League. He played one season of college basketball for the Arizona Wildcats before being selected eighth overall by the Detroit Pistons in the 2015 NBA draft.

High school career
A native of Fullerton, California, Johnson was one of the top high school recruits of 2014 by Rivals.com, Scout.com and ESPN. He was a four-time CIF State champion at Mater Dei High School. He played in the 2014 McDonald's All-American Boys Game, 2014 Jordan Brand Classic and the 2014 Nike Hoop Summit. He was also a 2014 USA Today first team All-USA Boys Basketball Team selection. He scored 2,285 career points at Mater Dei, the third-highest mark in school history behind Taylor King (3,216) and Tom Lewis (2,456).

College career
As a freshman at Arizona in 2014–15, Johnson was voted first-team All-Pac-12, and was named Pac-12 Freshman of the Year. He started 37 of the 38 games he played for the Wildcats, averaging 13.8 points, 6.5 rebounds, 1.7 assists and 1.5 steals in 28.4 minutes per game.

On April 23, 2015, Johnson declared for the NBA draft, forgoing his remaining three years of college eligibility. Johnson entered the draft as the 11th ranked prospect on ESPN's Top 100 draft board.

Professional career

Detroit Pistons (2015–2019)
On June 25, 2015, he was selected with the eighth overall pick in the 2015 NBA draft by the Pistons. In his debut for the Pistons on October 27, he recorded seven points, four rebounds and three assists off the bench in a 106–94 win over the Atlanta Hawks. On November 9, he recorded 20 points and seven rebounds in a 109–95 loss to the Golden State Warriors. On February 4, while starting at shooting guard in place of the injured Kentavious Caldwell-Pope, Johnson scored a season-high 22 points in a 111–105 win over the New York Knicks.

On November 25, 2016, Johnson was suspended for one game without pay by the Pistons for violating team rules. On December 10, he was assigned to the Grand Rapids Drive of the NBA Development League and was recalled the next day. On March 8, 2017, he scored a season-high 17 points in a 115–98 loss to the Indiana Pacers. On January 30, 2018, Johnson scored a then career-high 26 points in a 125–114 win over the Cleveland Cavaliers.

On November 9, 2018, Johnson scored a season-high 22 points in a 124–109 win over the Atlanta Hawks.

New Orleans Pelicans (2019)
On February 7, 2019, Johnson was acquired by the New Orleans Pelicans in a three-team trade involving the Pistons and Milwaukee Bucks. On June 26, the Pelicans declined to extend a $4.5 million qualifying offer to Johnson, making him an unrestricted free agent.

Toronto Raptors (2019–2021)
On July 11, 2019, Johnson signed with the Toronto Raptors.

On August 12, 2020, Johnson hit his first ever game winning shot with 4.9 seconds remaining in the 4th quarter against the Philadelphia 76ers in the 2019–20 NBA season in Orlando. On August 14, 2020, Johnson put up a season high 23 points against the Denver Nuggets coming off the bench in a 117–109 victory. The Raptors made it to the post-season and managed to get to the second round of the 2020 NBA Playoffs, the first time in Johnson's career that he advanced to the second round. They pushed the Boston Celtics to 7 games before ultimately falling.

On May 13, 2021, Johnson scored a career high 35 points in a 102–114 loss to the Chicago Bulls.

South Bay Lakers (2021)
On September 8, 2021, Johnson signed with the Chicago Bulls, but was waived on October 16, after appearing in four preseason games. On November 15, he signed with the South Bay Lakers where he played six games and averaged 15.3 points, 6.7 rebounds, 2.2 assists and 2.17 steals per game.

Los Angeles Lakers (2021–2022)
On December 9, 2021, Johnson signed a 10-day contract with the Chicago Bulls. On December 11, Johnson, along with Ayo Dosunmu, was placed in the NBA's health and safety protocols. He never played a single game for the Bulls before his contract expired.

On December 24, 2021, Johnson signed a 10-day contract with his hometown team, the Los Angeles Lakers, via the hardship exemption. On January 6, 2022, he was signed to a second 10-day contract, and on January 17, he was signed to a third 10-day contract. Johnson signed a two-year contract with the Lakers on January 26.

On August 25, 2022 Johnson was traded, alongside Talen Horton-Tucker, to the Utah Jazz in exchange for Patrick Beverley. On October 15, 2022, Johnson was waived.

Sioux Falls Skyforce (2022)
On December 8, 2022, Johnson signed with the Sioux Falls Skyforce.

San Antonio Spurs (2022–2023)
On December 12, 2022, Johnson signed with the San Antonio Spurs. On February 12, 2023, he was waived by the Spurs.

Return to Sioux Falls (2023–present)
On February 14, 2023, Johnson was reacquired by the Sioux Falls Skyforce.

Career statistics

NBA

Regular season

|-
| style="text-align:left;"| 
| style="text-align:left;"| Detroit
| 73 || 6 || 23.1 || .375 || .307 || .784 || 4.2 || 1.6 || .8 || .2 || 8.1
|-
| style="text-align:left;"| 
| style="text-align:left;"| Detroit
| 77 || 1 || 17.8 || .353 || .292 || .679 || 2.5 || 1.4 || .7 || .3 || 4.4
|-
| style="text-align:left;"| 
| style="text-align:left;"| Detroit
| 69 || 50 || 27.4 || .375 || .286 || .772 || 3.7 || 1.6 || 1.4 || .2 || 8.7
|-
| style="text-align:left;"| 
| style="text-align:left;"| Detroit
| 48 || 7 || 20.0 || .381 || .282 || .804 || 3.6 || 1.3 || 1.0 || .3 || 7.5
|-
| style="text-align:left;"| 
| style="text-align:left;"| New Orleans
| 18 || 0 || 13.7 || .418 || .324 || .692 || 2.3 || 1.6 || .7 || .1 || 5.3
|-
| style="text-align:left;"| 
| style="text-align:left;"| Toronto
| 25 || 0 || 6.0 || .373 || .292 || .563 || 1.5 || .8 || .2 || .2 || 2.4
|-
| style="text-align:left;"| 
| style="text-align:left;"| Toronto
| 61 || 13 || 16.5 || .382 || .328 || .800 || 2.5 || 1.5 || .9 || .3 || 4.4
|-
| style="text-align:left;"| 
| style="text-align:left;"| L.A. Lakers
| 48 || 27 || 22.8 || .466 || .314 || .716 || 3.2 || 1.7 || .9 || .3 || 6.7
|-
| style="text-align:left;"| 
| style="text-align:left;"| San Antonio
| 30 || 0 || 15.6 || .533 ||.450 || .667 || 3.2 || 2.2 || .5 || .2 || 5.8
|- class="sortbottom"
| style="text-align:center;" colspan="2"| Career
| 449 || 104 || 19.8 || .391 || .305 || .748 || 3.1 || 1.5 || .9 || .2 || 6.2

Playoffs

|-
| style="text-align:left;"| 2016
| style="text-align:left;"| Detroit
| 4 || 0 || 20.3|| .522 || .600 || 1.000 || 4.0 || .0 || .3 || .0 || 8.0
|-
| style="text-align:left;"| 2020
| style="text-align:left;"| Toronto
| 3 || 0 || 6.7 || .445 || .400 || 1.000 || 1.3 || 2.0 || .0 || .0 || 4.3
|- class="sortbottom"
| style="text-align:center;" colspan="2"| Career
| 7 || 0 || 14.4 || .500 || .533 || 1.000 || 2.9 || .9 || .1 || .0 || 6.4

College

|-
| style="text-align:left;"| 2014–15
| style="text-align:left;"| Arizona
| 38 || 38 || 28.4 || .446 || .371 || .742 || 6.5 || 1.7 || 1.5 || .4 || 13.8

Awards and honors
High school
First-team HS All-American USA Today (2014)
4× CIF Division I state champion (2011–2014)
MaxPreps.com High School National Player of the Year (2014)
California Mr. Basketball (2014)
All-California Interscholastic Federation (CIF) Division I first team (2012)
ESPNHS Cal-Hi Sports California Sophomore of the Year (2012)
MaxPreps.com Freshman All-America honorable mention (2011)
CIF All-state first team (2011, 2012)
CIF All-league first team (2012)

College
Julius Erving Award (2015)
All-Freshman All-American Team USBWA (2015)
Pac-12 Tournament All-Tournament Team (2015)
District IX All-District Team USBWA (2015)
Third-team USA Today All-American (2015)
First-team All-Pac-12 (2015)
Pac-12 Freshman Player of the Year (2015)
All-Pac-12 Freshman team (2015)
2014 Maui Invitational MVP, All-Tournament Team
2× Pac-12 Player of the Week (December 1, 2014; January 19, 2015)
NCAA Player of the Week (January 19, 2015)
Wayman Tisdale National Freshmen of the Week (January 18, 2015)
Wayman Tisdale National Freshmen of the Year Award Finalist

National team career
Johnson earned gold medals in the 2011 FIBA Americas Under-16 Championship, 2012 FIBA Under-17 World Championship and 2014 FIBA Americas Under-18 Championship. Johnson served as captain of the 2014 team and earned MVP of the 2014 tournament.

Personal life
Johnson was born in Anaheim, California to Karen Taylor and Stanley Johnson Sr. His parents divorced and his father remarried. Johnson was the couple's only child, and he was raised by his mother in Fullerton. His mother played college basketball for Jackson State, where she was inducted into their Sports Hall of Fame in 2009; she also played professionally in Europe. Johnson is the stepson of Easter Johnson, and has two brothers and two sisters. Johnson is a Christian.

References

External links

 Arizona Wildcats bio
 DraftExpress.com profile
 
 

1996 births
Living people
21st-century African-American sportspeople
African-American basketball players
All-American college men's basketball players
American expatriate basketball people in Canada
American men's basketball players
Arizona Wildcats men's basketball players
Basketball players from California
Detroit Pistons draft picks
Detroit Pistons players
Grand Rapids Drive players
Los Angeles Lakers players
McDonald's High School All-Americans
New Orleans Pelicans players
Parade High School All-Americans (boys' basketball)
Raptors 905 players
San Antonio Spurs players
Sioux Falls Skyforce players
Small forwards
South Bay Lakers players
Sportspeople from Fullerton, California
Toronto Raptors players